Abellen may refer to:

 The Abellen language (Aeta on Philippines)
 The modern site in Israel of Sabulon, an Ancient city, former bishopric and present Latin Catholic titular see